The A3 coupling (also known as A3 coupling reaction or the aldehyde-alkyne-amine reaction), coined by Prof. Chao-Jun Li of McGill University, is a type of multicomponent reaction involving an aldehyde, an alkyne and an amine which react to give a propargyl-amine.

The reaction proceeds via direct dehydrative condensation and requires a metal catalyst, typically based on ruthenium/copper, gold or silver. Chiral catalyst can be used to give an enantioselective reaction, yielding a chiral amine.  The solvent can be water. In the catalytic cycle the metal activates the alkyne to a metal acetylide, the amine and aldehyde combine to form an imine which then reacts with the acetylide in a nucleophilic addition. The reaction type was independently reported by three research groups in 2001 -2002; one report on a similar reaction dates back to 1953.  

If the amine substituents have an alpha hydrogen present and provided a suitable zinc or copper catalyst is used, the A3 coupling product may undergo a further internal hydride transfer and fragmentation to give an allene in a Crabbé reaction.

Decarboxylative A3 reaction
One variation is called the decarboxylative A3 coupling. In this reaction the amine is replaced by an amino acid. The imine can isomerise and the alkyne group is placed at the other available nitrogen alpha position. This reaction requires a copper catalyst. The redox A3 coupling has the same product outcome but the reactants are again an aldehyde, an amine and an alkyne as in the regular A3 coupling.

References 

Organic reactions
Multiple component reactions